A list of Chinese films released in 2001:

See also 
 2001 in China

References

External links
IMDb list of Chinese films

Chinese
Films
2001